Basketball Days is a yearly friendly international basketball tournament that is held in Zwolle, Netherlands since 2011. The tournament is played by 8 teams from around the world in the Landstede Topsportcentrum, home of Landstede Basketbal. It is held from December 26 till December 30.

The first two editions were won by the host team, Landstede Basketbal. The tournament won't be held since 2013.

Tournaments

Teams
A list of all teams that have participated at a Basketball Days-tournament.

Club teams
 Landstede Basketbal
 Grêmio Mogiano
 Barsy Atyrau
 Newcastle Eagles
 Jiangsu Lions

National teams
 Netherlands
 Nigeria
 United Arab Emirates

Unofficial teams
 New York City Warriors
 WNTA Falcons
 94 Fifty All Stars

Awards

References

Basketball in the Netherlands
2011 establishments in the Netherlands